Mauro Piacenza JCD (born 15 September 1944) is an Italian prelate of the Catholic Church. A cardinal since 2010, he has served as Penitentiary Major of the Apostolic Penitentiary since his appointment by Pope Francis on 21 September 2013. He was Prefect of the Congregation for the Clergy from 7 October 2010 to 21 September 2013. where he had been Secretary since 2007. At that Congregation, Pope Benedict XVI, according to one report, valued "his efficiency and in-depth knowledge of how the Congregation worked and its problems" and "his traditionalist ecclesiastical line of thought".

Early life
Piacenza was born in Genoa. After studying at the Major Archiepiscopal Seminary of Genoa, he was ordained to the priesthood by Giuseppe Siri on 21 December 1969. He then completed his studies at the Pontifical Lateran University, where he obtained a doctorate summa cum laude in canon law.

After serving as a parochial vicar, he worked as chaplain to the University of Genoa. Piacenza taught canon law at the Theological Faculty of Northern Italy and held several other posts, serving as the archbishop's press officer. He was the diocesan assistant of the ecclesial Movement of Cultural Commitment. He served as professor of contemporary culture and history of atheism at the Ligurian Higher Institute of Religious Studies as well as professor of dogmatic theology at the Diocesan Institute of Theology for the Lay "Didascaleion". He also taught theology at several state schools. He was made a canon of the Genoa Cathedral in 1986.

Service in the Roman Curia
He joined the staff of the Congregation for the Clergy in 1990  and was named its Undersecretary on 11 March 2000.

On 13 October 2003, Pope John Paul II appointed Piacenza President of the Pontifical Commission for the Cultural Heritage of the Church and Titular Bishop of Victoriana. He received his episcopal consecration on 15 November from Cardinal Tarcisio Bertone, with Cardinal Darío Castrillón Hoyos and Bishop Alberto Tanasini as co-consecrators.

He was named president of the Pontifical Commission for Sacred Archeology on 28 August 2004. He was appointed secretary of the Congregation for the Clergy and raised to the rank of archbishop on 7 May 2007. That appointment has been interpreted as Pope Benedict's way of positioning a thoroughly orthodox secretary to monitor the work of his superior, the far more liberal Cardinal Claudio Hummes. He was appointed Prefect of that Congregation on 7 October 2010. His appointment was unusual as few who serve as secretary are appointed prefect of the same dicastery.

On 20 November 2010 Pope Benedict XVI made him Cardinal-Deacon of San Paolo alle Tre Fontane and, on 29 December 2010, appointed him a member of the Congregation for Divine Worship and the Discipline of the Sacraments, the Congregation for Catholic Education, and the Pontifical Council for Social Communications.

He was one of the cardinal electors who participated in the 2013 papal conclave that elected Pope Francis.

Piacenza, like all officers of the Roman Curia, lost his position with the resignation of Pope Benedict XVI. Pope Francis reappointed them temporarily and then moved Piacenza from his position as Prefect of the Congregation for the Clergy to head the Apostolic Penitentiary on 21 September 2013. His new role was described as "a decidedly lower command post" as head of "a little-known Vatican tribunal that deals with confessions of sins so grave only a pope can grant absolution, such as the case of a priest who violates confessional secrecy". He had arrived years earlier at the Congregation for the Clergy as a check upon the Congregation's prefect Cardinal Hummes, one of Pope Francis' closest allies.

After ten years at the rank of cardinal deacon, he exercised his option to assume the rank of cardinal priest, which Pope Francis confirmed on 3 May 2021.

References

External links
 
 Catholic-Hierarchy

1944 births
Living people
21st-century Italian Roman Catholic titular archbishops
Clergy from Genoa
21st-century Italian cardinals
Prefects of the Congregation for the Clergy
Pontifical Commission for the Cultural Heritage of the Church
Pontifical Lateran University alumni
Cardinals created by Pope Benedict XVI
Members of the Congregation for Divine Worship and the Discipline of the Sacraments
Members of the Congregation for Catholic Education
Members of the Pontifical Council for Social Communications
Major Penitentiaries of the Apostolic Penitentiary